Lobby was a Slovak Eurodance band active between 1995 and 2001. They released four studio albums and sang in Slovak, English, and Spanish. The band was made up of Martina Ostatníková, Andrej Dziak, Milan Michalík, Karol Bližnák and, until 1997, Miroslav Babják.

Biography
Lobby's first album, Hi Dee Ho!, was released in 1995 on the independent label ENA Records. This was followed in 1996 by Power in Our Hands and Livin' Large (1997) on Sony's dance subsidiary Dance Pool. Their last album, Y2K, came out in 2000 on Ariola Records. The band broke up the following year.

Band members
 Martina Ostatníková – vocals
 Andrej Dziak – keyboards, rap, backing vocals
 Milan Michalík – keyboards, rap, backing vocals
 Karol Bližnák – keyboards, rap, backing vocals
 Miroslav Babják – keyboards, rap, backing vocals

Discography
 Hi Dee Ho! (1995)
 Power in Our Hands (1996)
 Livin' Large (1997)
 Y2K (2000)

See also
 List of Eurodance artists

References

Slovak musical groups
Slovak Eurodance groups